Jozef Prochotský (born 29 April 1951) is a Slovak football manager. He coached ŠK Slovan Bratislava, Dukla Banská Bystrica and FC Nitra. He is currently head coach of FK Levice.

References

ŠK Slovan Bratislava managers
FC Nitra managers
FC Petržalka managers
FK Dukla Banská Bystrica managers
Slovak football managers
Living people
1951 births